The Kelly bag (formerly known as the Sac à dépêches in 1935) is a leather handbag designed by the Paris-based, high-fashion luxury-goods manufacturer Hermès. The bag was redesigned several times before it was popularized by and then named after the American actress and Monégasque princess Grace Kelly. The bag is now an expensive status symbol.

Design 
The Kelly bag is a trapezium closed around the mouth with two horizontal straps. Four studs on the bottom, itself made of three layers of leather, enable it to stand on the ground. The padlock, keys and hardware are made of white or yellow gold. The current model Kelly bag, the Kelly II, comes in two distinct styles, as did its predecessor, the Kelly I. The sellier style is a rigid construction including a stiffening layer between the outer leather and inner lining, with the side and bottom stitching clearly visible; the retourné style is a softer construction, wherein the bag is sewn and then turned inside-out, hiding the exterior side stitching. The Kelly II, released in 2000 as an update to the original Kelly, has a double ring at the top handle, designed to attach to a shoulder strap; the original Kelly, while often sold with a shoulder strap, features a single-ring design. The construction of each Kelly bag requires 18 to 25 hours of handicraft, with each item being created by a single artisan, resulting in high retail prices.

History 
In 1923, Émile-Maurice Hermès and Ettore Bugatti designed a thoroughly simple and plain bag for Hermès's wife Julie, named after Bugatti. The Bugatti was the first bag designed by Hermès specifically as a women's handbag and is notable for being the first handbag to utilize a zipper pull. In 1935, Hermès's son-in-law Robert Dumas redesigned it as a spacious travel bag called Sac à dépêches. It was a sharp contrast to the dominant purses of the time, which were simple, small and flat, resembling envelopes.

Association with Grace Kelly 

Alfred Hitchcock has been credited with bringing the handbag into the limelight. In 1954, Hitchcock allowed the costume designer Edith Head to purchase Hermès accessories for the film To Catch a Thief, starring Grace Kelly. According to Head, Kelly "fell in love" with the bag. In 1956 she became princess of Monaco and was photographed using the handbag to shield her growing belly from the paparazzi during her first pregnancy. That photograph was featured in Life magazine. Princess Grace was a fashion icon, and the handbag immediately achieved great popularity. Although the handbag instantly became known as the Kelly bag, it was not officially renamed until 1977.

The handbag with which Princess Grace was photographed was loaned from the palace archives of Monaco and displayed in the Victoria and Albert Museum in April 2010, along with other notable wardrobe items owned by the princess. The "star exhibit" of the show contains scuffs and marks, as the wardrobe thrifty princess carried it for many years. Hermès now creates 32 styles of handbags, but the Kelly persists as the manufacturer's best-seller.

See also 
 Birkin bag, an Hermès product which also originated from a travel bag and was named after the actress Jane Birkin
 It bag
 Wedding dress of Grace Kelly

References

External links 

 
 

20th-century fashion
21st-century fashion
Bags (fashion)
Grace Kelly
Leather goods